Otto Altweck (born 28 March 1937) is a German racing cyclist. He rode in the 1959 Tour de France.

References

External links
 

1937 births
Living people
German male cyclists
Cyclists from Munich